Orofino Junior/Senior High School, is a six-year secondary school in the northwest United States, located in Orofino, Idaho, part of a combined high school and junior high school operated by the Orofino Joint School District #171. The school colors are royal blue, black, and white and the mascot is the maniac.

West of the city center, the present campus was built in the late 1960s, and the junior high was added recently, following the closure of the century-old junior high building in 2010. The 8th grade was added in 2010 and the 7th grade in 2012, after two years at the elementary school.

OHS overlooks the Clearwater River from above its north bank.

Orofino is the larger of the two high schools operated by the school district; the other is Timberline to the east, midway between Weippe and Pierce on Highway 11.

Athletics
Orofino competes in athletics in IHSAA Class 2A in the Central Idaho League with Grangeville and St. Maries.

State titles

Boys

 Basketball (2):  1949, 1950 
 Track (1):  1985

Girls

 Golf (1):  2008

References

External links

MaxPreps.com - Orofino Maniacs
Orofino Joint School District #171

Public high schools in Idaho
Schools in Clearwater County, Idaho
Public middle schools in Idaho
1960s establishments in Idaho